The 2008 Tour de San Luis was a men's road cycling race held from 22  to January 27, 2008 in Argentina. The second edition of this road racing event was a multiple stage race with a prologue, five stages and a total length of 622 kilometres.

Stage summary

General Classification

References
 Report
 edosof

Tour de San Luis
Tour de San Luis
Tour de San Luis
January 2008 sports events in South America